Plaxomicrus oberthuri is a species of beetle in the family Cerambycidae. It was described by Gahan in 1901. It is native to Meghalaya, India.

References

Astathini
Beetles described in 1901